Ray Anderson may refer to:
Ray Anderson (athletic director), athletic director at Arizona State University
Ray Anderson (boxer) (born 1944), light heavyweight boxer
Ray Anderson (broadcaster)
Ray Anderson (journalist), The New York Times reporter 
Ray Anderson (musician) (born 1952), jazz trombonist
Ray Anderson (entrepreneur) (1934–2011), founder and chairman of Interface Inc.
Ray Anderson (footballer) (born 1947), Australian rules footballer

See also
Raymond Anderson (disambiguation)